Deutsches Museum may mean:
The Deutsches Museum, a science and technology museum in Munich
The Deutsches Museum Berlin, once part of the Antikensammlung Berlin
The Deutsches Museum Bonn, a museum with exhibits and experiments of famous scientists, engineers and inventors